Alisha Weir (born 26 September 2009) is an Irish child singer and actress. She began her career in theatre and rose to prominence when she starred as Matilda Wormwood in the film Matilda: The Musical (2022).

Early life
Alisha Weir was born in Dublin, Ireland, on 26 September 2009, and grew up in the South Dublin suburb of Knocklyon. She attended Our Lady's School. Her three older sisters took drama classes, which Weir joined when she was old enough.

Career
When the musical Once returned to Dublin's Olympia Theatre in 2017, Weir played Ivanka. She made her feature film debut in the 2018 thriller Don't Leave Home and her television debut as Laura in the 2019 crime drama Darklands. She appeared in Tim Finnegan's productions of Annie, The Wizard of Oz, and Oliver! at the National Concert Hall. She rose to fame when she starred as Matilda in Matilda the Musical, which is a film based on Matilda, by Roald Dahl, that has been adapted as theatre shows and films.

Weir was eleven when she was cast as the titular Matilda Wormwood in the film adaptation of Matilda the Musical for Netflix, and thirteen by the film's premiere in 2022.

Filmography

Stage

Awards and nominations

References

External links
 

Living people
2009 births
21st-century Irish actresses
Actresses from County Dublin
Irish child actresses
People from South Dublin (county)